Janićijević or Janicijevic is a Serbian family name.

Notable people with this name include:

 Dušan Janićijević (actor) (1932–2011), Serbian actor
 Dušan Janićijević (athlete) (born 1955), Serbian former long-distance runner 
 Jovan Janićijević Burduš (1932–1992), Serbian actor
 Miloš Janićijević (born 1989), Serbian footballer
 Séléna Janicijevic (born 2000), French tennis player

See also 
 Janić
 Janič

Serbian surnames